John James Hollister Jr. (December 24, 1901 - November 23, 1961) was an agriculturalist, banker, and California state senator.

Family
John James Hollister Jr. was born in 1901 in Santa Barbara, California. He was the son of J. James Hollister and Dorothy (Steffens) Hollister of Hollister Ranch, and the grandson of William Welles Hollister. His mother was Lottie Steffens Hollister the sister of journalist Lincoln Steffens.

Marriage
John J. Hollister Jr. married Cynthia Boyd in the year of 1928.

Information

In San Benito County, the city of Hollister was named after John J. Hollister Jr.'s grandfather, William Welles Hollister, who had possession of the land during the years 1861–1875. His grandfather also had "Hollister Ranch" named after him. This area is in Santa Barbara, California and is known among seasoned surfers to be a good spot for surfing.

Death
John James Hollister Jr. died in office in Santa Barbara in the year of 1961.

Sources
University of California Davis: Biography of John J. Hollister, Jr.
Ladies in the Laboratory v. 2

References

People from Santa Barbara, California
1901 births
1961 deaths
Democratic Party California state senators
20th-century American politicians